Royidris is a Malagasy genus of ants in the subfamily Myrmicinae. Described in 2014, the genus contains 15 species endemic to Madagascar.

Description
Queens are known for R. admixta, R. diminuta, R. notorthotenes, R. peregrina, and R. shuckardi, plus two unassociated forms. Alate when virgin, considerably larger than the worker. Males are known only for R. notorthotenes and R. peregrina. About the same size as the worker or slightly smaller, much smaller than the queen.

Taxonomy
The species included in this genus exhibit a habitus that is convergent on some groups of Monomorium. In his study of the Afrotropical members of that genus Bolton (1987) noted two indeterminate Madagascan species which had a high palp formula (5,3), the highest attributed to Monomorium, but did no further analysis of these odd species because the focus of the survey was the extensive Afrotropical fauna. Heterick (2006), in his revision of the Malagasy species of Monomorium, recognised the peculiarity of the high palp formula and utilised it, together with some other characters, to define his M. shuckardi group, all members of which are now transferred to Royidris. No unambiguous apomorphy can be stated for Royidris, and in fact its habitus is similar to that commonly seen in Monomorium.

Species

admixta group
Vitsika admixta Bolton & Fisher, 2014
Vitsika depilosa Bolton & Fisher, 2014

robertsoni group
Vitsika anxietas Bolton & Fisher, 2014
Vitsika clarinodis (Heterick, 2006)
Vitsika pallida Bolton & Fisher, 2014
Vitsika pulchra Bolton & Fisher, 2014
Vitsika robertsoni (Heterick, 2006)

notorthotenes group
Vitsika diminuta Bolton & Fisher, 2014
Vitsika etiolata Bolton & Fisher, 2014
Vitsika gravipuncta Bolton & Fisher, 2014
Vitsika longiseta Bolton & Fisher, 2014
Vitsika notorthotenes (Heterick, 2006)
Vitsika peregrina Bolton & Fisher, 2014
Vitsika shuckardi (Forel, 1895)
Vitsika singularis Bolton & Fisher, 2014

References

Myrmicinae
Ant genera
Hymenoptera of Africa
Insects of Madagascar
Endemic fauna of Madagascar